Afroditi Kosma (born 6 June 1983), is a Greek professional basketball player who plays for Olympiacos and Greece women's national basketball team. She has represented national team in several Eurobasket Women.

References

External links
 
 
 

Living people
Greek women's basketball players
Panathinaikos WBC players
Olympiacos Women's Basketball players
1983 births
Basketball players from Athens
Power forwards (basketball)
European Games competitors for Greece
Basketball players at the 2015 European Games
21st-century Greek women